

Events

Pre-1600
 351 – The Jewish revolt against Constantius Gallus breaks out after his arrival at Antioch.
 558 – In Constantinople, the dome of the Hagia Sophia collapses, twenty years after its construction. Justinian I immediately orders that the dome be rebuilt.
1274 – In France, the Second Council of Lyon opens; it ratified a decree to regulate the election of the Pope.
1487 – The Siege of Málaga commences during the Spanish Reconquista.
1544 – The Burning of Edinburgh by an English army is the first action of the Rough Wooing.

1601–1900
1625 – State funeral of James VI and I (1566-1625) is held at Westminster Abbey.
1664 – Inaugural celebrations begin at Louis XIV of France's new Palace of Versailles.
1685 – Battle of Vrtijeljka between rebels and Ottoman forces.
1697 – Stockholm's royal castle (dating back to medieval times) is destroyed by fire. It is replaced in the 18th century by the current Royal Palace.
1718 – The city of New Orleans is founded by Jean-Baptiste Le Moyne, Sieur de Bienville.
1763 – Pontiac's War begins with Pontiac's attempt to seize Fort Detroit from the British.
1794 – French Revolution: Robespierre introduces the Cult of the Supreme Being in the National Convention as the new state religion of the French First Republic.
1798 – French Revolutionary Wars: A French force attempting to dislodge a small British garrison on the Îles Saint-Marcouf is  repulsed with heavy losses.
1824 – World premiere of Ludwig van Beethoven's Ninth Symphony in Vienna, Austria. The performance is conducted by Michael Umlauf under the composer's supervision.
1832 – Greece's independence is recognized by the Treaty of London. 
1840 – The Great Natchez Tornado strikes Natchez, Mississippi killing 317 people. It is the second deadliest tornado in United States history.
1846 – The Cambridge Chronicle, America's oldest surviving weekly newspaper, is published for the first time in Cambridge, Massachusetts.
1864 – American Civil War: The Army of the Potomac, under General Ulysses S. Grant, breaks off from the Battle of the Wilderness and moves southwards.
  1864   – The world's oldest surviving clipper ship, the City of Adelaide is launched by William Pile, Hay and Co. in Sunderland, England, for transporting passengers and goods between Britain and Australia.
1895 – In Saint Petersburg, Russian scientist Alexander Stepanovich Popov demonstrates to the Russian Physical and Chemical Society his invention, the Popov lightning detector—a primitive radio receiver. In some parts of the former Soviet Union the anniversary of this day is celebrated as Radio Day.

1901–present
1915 – World War I: German submarine  sinks RMS Lusitania, killing 1,198 people, including 128 Americans. Public reaction to the sinking turns many former pro-Germans in the United States against the German Empire.
  1915   – The Republic of China accedes to 13 of the 21 Demands, extending the Empire of Japan control over Manchuria and the Chinese economy.
1920 – Kyiv Offensive: Polish troops led by Józef Piłsudski and Edward Rydz-Śmigły and assisted by a symbolic Ukrainian force capture Kyiv only to be driven out by the Red Army counter-offensive a month later.
  1920   – Treaty of Moscow: Soviet Russia recognizes the independence of the Democratic Republic of Georgia only to invade the country six months later.
1930 – The 7.1  Salmas earthquake shakes northwestern Iran and southeastern Turkey with a maximum Mercalli intensity of IX (Violent). Up to three-thousand people were killed.
1931 – The stand-off between criminal Francis Crowley and 300 members of the New York Police Department takes place in his fifth-floor apartment on West 91st Street, New York City.
1937 – Spanish Civil War: The German Condor Legion, equipped with Heinkel He 51 biplanes, arrives in Spain to assist Francisco Franco's forces.
1940 – World War II: The Norway Debate in the British House of Commons begins, and leads to the replacement of Prime Minister Neville Chamberlain with Winston Churchill three days later.
1942 – World War II: During the Battle of the Coral Sea, United States Navy aircraft carrier aircraft attack and sink the Imperial Japanese Navy light aircraft carrier Shōhō; the battle marks the first time in naval history that two enemy fleets fight without visual contact between warring ships.
1945 – World War II: Last German U-boat attack of the war, two freighters are sunk off the Firth of Forth, Scotland.
  1945   – World War II: General Alfred Jodl signs unconditional surrender terms at Reims, France, ending Germany's participation in the war. The document takes effect the next day.
1946 – Tokyo Telecommunications Engineering (later renamed Sony) is founded.
1948 – The Council of Europe is founded during the Hague Congress.
1952 – The concept of the integrated circuit, the basis for all modern computers, is first published by Geoffrey Dummer.
1954 – Indochina War: The Battle of Dien Bien Phu ends in a French defeat and a Viet Minh victory (the battle began on March 13).
1960 – Cold War: U-2 Crisis of 1960: Soviet leader Nikita Khrushchev announces that his nation is holding American U-2 pilot Gary Powers.
1986 – Canadian Patrick Morrow becomes the first person to climb each of the Seven Summits.
1991 – A fire and explosion occurs at a fireworks factory at Sungai Buloh, Malaysia, killing 26.
1992 – Michigan ratifies a 203-year-old proposed amendment to the United States Constitution making the 27th Amendment law. This amendment bars the U.S. Congress from giving itself a mid-term pay raise.
  1992   – Space Shuttle program: The Space Shuttle Endeavour is launched on its first mission, STS-49.
  1992   – Three employees at a McDonald's Restaurant in Sydney, Nova Scotia, Canada, are brutally murdered and a fourth permanently disabled after a botched robbery. It is the first "fast-food murder" in Canada.
1994 – Edvard Munch's painting The Scream is recovered undamaged after being stolen from the National Gallery of Norway in February.
1998 – Mercedes-Benz buys Chrysler for US$40 billion and forms DaimlerChrysler in the largest industrial merger in history.
1999 – Pope John Paul II travels to Romania, becoming the first pope to visit a predominantly Eastern Orthodox country since the Great Schism in 1054.
  1999   – Kosovo War: Three Chinese citizens are killed and 20 wounded when a NATO aircraft inadvertently bombs the Chinese embassy in Belgrade, Serbia. 
  1999   – In Guinea-Bissau, President João Bernardo Vieira is ousted in a military coup.
2000 – Vladimir Putin is inaugurated as president of Russia.
2002 – An EgyptAir Boeing 737-500 crashes on approach to Tunis–Carthage International Airport, killing 14 people.
  2002   – A China Northern Airlines MD-82 plunges into the Yellow Sea, killing 112 people.
2004 – American businessman Nick Berg is beheaded by Islamic militants. The act is recorded on videotape and released on the Internet.

Births

Pre-1600
Before 160 – Julia Maesa, Roman noblewoman (d. 224) 
1488 – John III of the Palatinate, archbishop of Regensburg (d. 1538)
1530 – Louis, Prince of Condé (d. 1569)
1553 – Albert Frederick, Duke of Prussia (d. 1618)
1605 – Patriarch Nikon of Moscow (d. 1681)
1643 – Stephanus Van Cortlandt, American politician, 10th Mayor of New York City (d. 1700)

1601–1900
1700 – Gerard van Swieten, Dutch-Austrian physician (d. 1772)
1701 – Carl Heinrich Graun, German tenor and composer (d. 1759)
1711 – David Hume, Scottish economist, historian, and philosopher (d. 1776)
1724 – Dagobert Sigmund von Wurmser, French-Austrian field marshal (d. 1797)
1740 – Nikolai Arkharov, Russian police officer and general (d. 1814)
1748 – Olympe de Gouges, French playwright and philosopher (d. 1793)
1763 – Józef Poniatowski, Polish general (d. 1813)
1767 – Princess Frederica Charlotte of Prussia (d. 1820)
1774 – William Bainbridge, American commodore (d. 1833)
1787 – Jacques Viger, Canadian archaeologist and politician, 1st mayor of Montreal (d. 1858)
1812 – Robert Browning, English poet and playwright (d. 1889)
1833 – Johannes Brahms, German pianist and composer (d. 1897)
1836 – Joseph Gurney Cannon, American lawyer and politician, 40th Speaker of the United States House of Representatives (d. 1926)
1837 – Karl Mauch, German geographer and explorer (d. 1875)
1840 – Pyotr Ilyich Tchaikovsky, Russian composer and educator (d. 1893)
1845 – Mary Eliza Mahoney, American nurse and activist (d. 1926)
1847 – Archibald Primrose, 5th Earl of Rosebery, English politician, Prime Minister of the United Kingdom (d. 1929)
1857 – William A. MacCorkle, American lawyer and politician, 9th Governor of West Virginia (d. 1930)
1860 – Tom Norman, English businessman (d. 1930)
1861 – Rabindranath Tagore, Indian author and poet, Nobel Prize laureate (d. 1941)
1867 – Władysław Reymont, Polish novelist, Nobel Prize laureate (d. 1925)
1875 – Bill Hoyt, American pole vaulter (d. 1951)
1880 – Pandurang Vaman Kane, Indologist and Sanskrit scholar, Bharat Ratna awardee (d. 1972)
1881 – George E. Wiley, American cyclist (d. 1954)
1882 – Willem Elsschot, Belgian author and poet (d. 1960)
1885 – George "Gabby" Hayes, American actor (d. 1969)
1889 – Viktor Puskar, Estonian colonel (d. 1943)
1891 – Harry McShane, Scottish engineer and activist (d. 1988)
1892 – Archibald MacLeish, American poet, playwright, and lawyer (d. 1982)
  1892   – Josip Broz Tito, Yugoslav field marshal and politician, 1st President of Yugoslavia (d. 1980)
1893 – Frank J. Selke, Canadian ice hockey coach and manager (d. 1985)
1896 – Kathleen McKane Godfree, English tennis and badminton player (d. 1992)
1899 – Alfred Gerrard, English sculptor and academic (d. 1998)

1901–present
1901 – Gary Cooper, American actor (d. 1961)
1903 – Jimmy Ball, Canadian sprinter (d. 1988)
  1903   – Nikolay Zabolotsky, Russian-Soviet poet and translator (d. 1958)
1905 – Philip Baxter, Welsh-Australian chemical engineer (d. 1989)
1906 – Eric Krenz, American discus thrower and shot putter (d. 1931)
1909 – Edwin H. Land, American scientist and inventor, co-founded the Polaroid Corporation (d. 1991)
  1909   – Dorothy Sunrise Lorentino, Native American teacher (d. 2005)  
1911 – Ishirō Honda, Japanese director, producer, and screenwriter (d. 1993)
  1911   – Rıfat Ilgaz, Turkish author, poet, and educator (d. 1993)
1912 – Pannalal Patel, Indian author (d. 1989)
1913 – John Spencer Hardy, American general (d. 2012)
  1913   – Simon Ramo, American physicist and engineer (d. 2016)
1914 – Arthur Snelling, English civil servant and diplomat. British Ambassador to South Africa (d. 1996)
1916 – Huw Wheldon, Welsh-English broadcaster (d. 1986)
  1916   – W. B. Young, Scottish rugby player and physician (d. 2013)
1917 – Domenico Bartolucci, Italian cardinal and composer (d. 2013)
  1917   – Lenox Hewitt, Australian public servant (d. 2020)
  1917   – David Tomlinson, English actor (d. 2000)
1919 – Eva Perón, Argentinian actress, 25th First Lady of Argentina (d. 1952)
1920 – Rendra Karno, Indonesian actor (d. 1985)
1921 – Asa Briggs, Baron Briggs, English historian and academic (d. 2016)
  1921   – Gaston Rébuffat, French mountaineer and author (d. 1985)
1922 – Darren McGavin, American actor and director (d. 2006)
  1922   – Joe O'Donnell, American photographer and journalist (d. 2007)
1923 – Anne Baxter, American actress (d. 1985)
  1923   – Jim Lowe, American singer-songwriter, disc jockey, and radio host (d. 2016)
  1923   – Bülent Ulusu, Turkish admiral and politician, 18th Prime Minister of Turkey (d. 2015)
1924 – Albert Band, French-American director and producer (d. 2002)
1925 – Lauri Vaska, Estonian-American chemist and academic (d. 2015)
1927 – Ruth Prawer Jhabvala, German-American author and screenwriter (d. 2013)
1929 – Dick Williams, American baseball player, coach, and manager (d. 2011)
1930 – Totie Fields, American comedian and author (d. 1978)
  1930   – Babe Parilli, American football player and coach (d. 2017)
  1930   – John Smith, Baron Kirkhill, English politician
1931 – Teresa Brewer, American singer (d. 2007)
  1931   – Gene Wolfe, American author (d. 2019)
1932 – Jordi Bonet, Spanish-Canadian painter and sculptor (d. 1979)
  1932   – Alan Cuthbert, English pharmacologist and academic (d. 2016)
  1932   – Pete Domenici, American lawyer and politician, 37th Mayor of Albuquerque (d. 2017)
  1932   – Derek Taylor, English journalist and author  (d. 1997)
1933 – Johnny Unitas, American football player and sportscaster (d. 2002)
1935 – Avraham Heffner, Israeli actor, director, and screenwriter (d. 2014)
  1935   – Michael Hopkins, English architect
1936 – Robin Hanbury-Tenison, English explorer and author
  1936   – Tony O'Reilly, Irish rugby player and businessman
  1936   – Jimmy Ruffin, American soul singer (d. 2014)
1937 – Eddie Clayton, English footballer
  1937   – Claude Raymond, Canadian baseball player and coach
1939 – Sidney Altman, Canadian-American biologist and academic, Nobel Prize laureate (d. 2022)
  1939   – Ruggero Deodato, Italian actor, director, and screenwriter (d. 2022)
  1939   – Ruud Lubbers, Dutch economist and politician, Prime Minister of the Netherlands (d. 2018)
  1939   – Johnny Maestro, American pop/doo-wop singer (d. 2010)
  1939   – Clive Soley, Baron Soley, English politician
1940 – Angela Carter, English novelist and short story writer  (d. 1992)
  1940   – Dave Chambers, Canadian ice hockey player and coach
1941 – Lawrence Collins, Baron Collins of Mapesbury, English lawyer and judge
1943 – Terry Allen, American singer and painter 
  1943   – Harvey Andrews, English singer-songwriter and poet
  1943   – John Bannon, Australian academic and politician, 39th Premier of South Australia (d. 2015)
  1943   – Peter Carey, Australian novelist and short story writer
1945 – Christy Moore, Irish singer-songwriter and guitarist 
  1945   – Robin Strasser, American actress
1946 – Thelma Houston, American R&B/disco singer and actress
  1946   – Marv Hubbard, American football player (d. 2015)
  1946   – Bill Kreutzmann, American drummer
  1946   – Michael Rosen, English author and poet
  1946   – Brian Turner, English chef and television host
1949 – Kathy Ahern, American golfer (d. 1996)
  1949   – Deborah Butterfield, American sculptor
1950 – John Dowling Coates, Australian lawyer, sports administrator and businessman
  1950   – Randall "Tex" Cobb, American boxer and actor
  1950   – Tim Russert, American television journalist and lawyer (d. 2008)
1953 – Pat McInally, American football player and coach
  1953   – Ian McKay, English sergeant, Victoria Cross recipient (d. 1982)
1954 – Philippe Geluck, Belgian cartoonist
  1954   – Joanna Haigh, English meteorologist and physicist
  1954   – Amy Heckerling, American director, producer, and screenwriter
1955 – Clément Gignac, Canadian politician
  1955   – Axel Zwingenberger, German pianist and songwriter
1956 – Jan Peter Balkenende, Dutch jurist and politician, Prime Minister of the Netherlands
  1956   – Anne Dudley, English pianist and composer 
  1956   – Nicholas Hytner, English director and producer
  1956   – Jean Lapierre, Canadian talk show host and politician (d. 2016)
  1956   – Calum MacDonald, Scottish journalist and politician
1957 – Kristina M. Johnson, American business executive, engineer, academic, and government official 
1958 – Mikhail Biryukov, Russian footballer and manager
  1958   – Mark G. Kuzyk, American physicist and academic
  1958   – Anne Marie Rafferty, English nurse and academic
1959 – Michael E. Knight, American actor
  1959   – Tony Sealy, English footballer and manager
  1959   – Heiki Valk, Estonian archeologist and academic
1960 – Adam Bernstein, American director and screenwriter
  1960   – Ara Darzi, Baron Darzi of Denham, Iraqi-English surgeon and academic
  1960   – Almudena Grandes, Spanish author
1961 – Hans-Peter Bartels, German politician
  1961   – Sue Black, Scottish anthropologist and academic
  1961   – Ivar Must, Estonian composer and producer
1962 – Tony Campbell, American basketball player and coach
  1962   – Judith Donath, American computer scientist and academic
1964 – Ronnie Harmon, American football player
  1964   – Denis Mandarino, Brazilian guitarist, composer, and painter
  1964   – Leslie O'Neal, American football player
1965 – Reuben Davis, American football player
  1965   – Owen Hart, Canadian wrestler (d. 1999)
  1965   – Norman Whiteside, Northern Irish footballer and manager
  1965   – Huang Zhihong, Chinese shot putter
1967 – Martin Bryant, Australian mass murderer
  1967   – Adam Price, Danish chef and screenwriter
  1967   – Joe Rice, American colonel and politician
1968 – Traci Lords, American actress and singer
  1968   – Lisa Raitt, Canadian lawyer and politician, 30th Canadian Minister of Transport
1969 – Eagle-Eye Cherry, Swedish singer-songwriter
  1969   – Jun Falkenstein, American director, producer, and screenwriter
  1969   – Katerina Maleeva, Bulgarian tennis player
1971 – Reidar Horghagen, Norwegian drummer 
  1971   – Dave Karpa, Canadian ice hockey player
  1971   – Thomas Piketty, French economist 
1972 – Peter Dubovský, Czech-Slovak footballer (d. 2000)
  1972   – Frank Trigg, American mixed martial artist and wrestler
1973 – Kristian Lundin, Swedish songwriter and producer
  1973   – Paolo Savoldelli, Italian cyclist
1974 – Ian Pearce, English footballer and assistant manager
1975 – Ashley Cowan, English cricketer
1976 – Calvin Booth, American basketball player
  1976   – Berke Hatipoğlu, Turkish guitarist and songwriter 
  1976   – Stacey Jones, New Zealand rugby league player
  1976   – Andrea Lo Cicero, Italian rugby player
  1976   – Michael P. Murphy, American lieutenant, Medal of Honor recipient (d. 2005)
  1976   – Ayelet Shaked, former Israeli Minister of Justice
1977 – Elton Flatley, Australian rugby player
1978 – Stian Arnesen, Norwegian guitarist, drummer, and songwriter 
  1978   – James Carter, American hurdler
  1978   – Shawn Marion, American basketball player
1979 – Katie Douglas, American basketball player
1983 – Phionah Atuhebwe, Ugandan vaccinologist and immunization expert
1984 – Kevin Owens, Canadian wrestler
1985 – Jarrad Hickey, Australian rugby league player
  1985   – Drew Neitzel, American basketball player
1986 – Matt Helders, English drummer 
1987 – Asami Konno, Japanese singer 
  1987   – Michael Maidens, English footballer (d. 2007)
  1987   – Mark Reynolds, Scottish footballer
  1987   – David Schlemko, Canadian ice hockey player
1988 – Eino Puri, Estonian footballer
  1988   – Sander Puri, Estonian footballer
1989 – Earl Thomas, American football player
1993 – Ajla Tomljanovic, Australian tennis player
1995 – Seko Fofana, French born Ivorian international footballer
1997 – Daria Kasatkina, Russian tennis player
1998 – Maryna Piddubna, Ukrainian Paralympic swimmer
  1998   – Jesse Puljujärvi, Finnish ice hockey player
  1998   – MrBeast, American YouTuber 
  2004 – Ashlyn Krueger, American tennis player

Deaths

Pre-1600
 721 – John of Beverley, bishop of York
 833 – Ibn Hisham, Egyptian Muslim historian
 973 – Otto I, Holy Roman Emperor (b. 912)
1014 – Bagrat III, 1st King of Georgia (b. 960)
1092 – Remigius de Fécamp, English monk and bishop 
1166 – William I of Sicily
1202 – Hamelin de Warenne, Earl of Surrey
1205 – Ladislaus III of Hungary (b. 1201)
1234 – Otto I, Duke of Merania (b. c. 1180)
1243 – Hugh d'Aubigny, 5th Earl of Arundel
1427 – Thomas la Warr, 5th Baron De La Warr, English priest (b. 1352)
1494 – Eskender, Emperor of Ethiopia (b. 1471)
1523 – Franz von Sickingen, German knight (b. 1481)
1539 – Ottaviano Petrucci, Italian printer (b. 1466)

1601–1900
1617 – David Fabricius, German astronomer and theologian (b. 1564)
1667 – Johann Jakob Froberger, German organist and composer (b. 1616)
1682 – Feodor III of Russia (b. 1661)
1685 – Bajo Pivljanin (b. 1630)
1718 – Mary of Modena (b. 1658)
1793 – Pietro Nardini, Italian violinist and composer (b. 1722)
1800 – Niccolò Piccinni, Italian composer (b. 1728)
1805 – William Petty, 2nd Earl of Shelburne, Irish-English general and politician, Prime Minister of the United Kingdom (b. 1737)
1815 – Jabez Bowen, American colonel and politician, 45th Deputy Governor of Rhode Island (b. 1739)
1825 – Antonio Salieri, Italian composer and conductor (b. 1750)
1840 – Caspar David Friedrich, German painter and educator (b. 1774)
1868 – Henry Brougham, 1st Baron Brougham and Vaux, Scottish lawyer and politician, Lord High Chancellor of Great Britain (b. 1778)
1872 – Alexander Loyd, American carpenter and politician, 4th Mayor of Chicago (b. 1805)
1876 – William Buell Sprague, American clergyman, historian, and author (b. 1795)
1887 – C. F. W. Walther, German-American religious leader and theologian (b. 1811)
1896 – H. H. Holmes, American serial killer (b. 1861)

1901–present
1902 – Agostino Roscelli, Italian priest and saint (b. 1818)
1917 – Albert Ball, English fighter pilot (b. 1896)
1922 – Max Wagenknecht, German pianist and composer (b. 1857)
1924 – Alluri Sitarama Raju, Indian activist (b. 1897/1898) 
1925 – William Lever, 1st Viscount Leverhulme, English businessman and politician (b. 1851)
1937 – Ernst A. Lehmann, German captain and author (b. 1886) 
1938 – Octavian Goga, Romanian politician, former Prime Minister (b. 1881)
1940 – George Lansbury, English journalist and politician (b. 1859)
1941 – James George Frazer, Scottish-English anthropologist and academic (b. 1854)
1942 – Felix Weingartner, Croatian pianist, composer, and conductor (b. 1863)
1943 – Fethi Okyar, Turkish colonel and politician, 2nd Prime Minister of Turkey (b. 1880)
1946 – Herbert Macaulay, Nigerian journalist and politician (b. 1864)
1951 – Warner Baxter, American actor (b. 1889)
1967 – Margaret Larkin, American writer and poet (b. 1899)
1958 – Mihkel Lüdig, Estonian organist, composer, and conductor (b. 1880)
1976 – Alison Uttley, English children's book writer (b. 1884)
1978 – Mort Weisinger, American journalist and author (b. 1915)
1986 – Haldun Taner, Turkish playwright and author (b. 1915)
1987 – Colin Blakely, Northern Irish actor (b. 1930)
  1987   – Paul Popham, American soldier and activist, co-founded Gay Men's Health Crisis (b. 1941)
1990 – Sam Tambimuttu, Sri Lankan lawyer and politician (b. 1932)
1994 – Clement Greenberg, American art critic (b. 1909)
1995 – Ray McKinley, American drummer, singer, and bandleader (Glenn Miller Orchestra) (b. 1910)
1998 – Allan McLeod Cormack, South African-English physicist and academic, Nobel Prize laureate (b. 1924)
  1998   – Eddie Rabbitt, American singer-songwriter and guitarist (b. 1941)
2000 – Douglas Fairbanks, Jr., American captain, actor, and producer (b. 1909)
2001 – Jacques de Bourbon-Busset, French author and politician (b. 1912)
2004 – Waldemar Milewicz, Polish journalist (b. 1956)
2005 – Tristan Egolf, American author and activist (b. 1971)
  2005   – Peter Rodino, American captain and politician (b. 1909)
  2005   – Otilino Tenorio, Ecuadorian footballer (b. 1980)
2006 – Richard Carleton, Australian journalist (b. 1943)
  2006   – Joan C. Edwards, American singer and philanthropist (b. 1918)
2007 – Isabella Blow, English magazine editor (b. 1958)
  2007   – Diego Corrales, American boxer (b. 1977)
  2007   – Octavian Paler, Romanian journalist and politician (b. 1926)
  2007   – Yahweh ben Yahweh, American cult leader, founded the Nation of Yahweh (b. 1935)
2009 – David Mellor, English designer (b. 1930)
  2009   – Danny Ozark, American baseball player, coach, and manager (b. 1923)
2011 – Seve Ballesteros, Spanish golfer (b. 1957)
  2011   – Willard Boyle, Canadian physicist and academic, Nobel Prize laureate (b. 1924)
  2011   – Big George, English songwriter, producer, and radio host (b. 1957)
2012 – Sammy Barr, Scottish trade union leader (b. 1931)
  2012   – Ferenc Bartha, Hungarian economist and politician (b. 1943)
  2012   – Dennis E. Fitch, American captain and pilot (b. 1942)
2013 – Ferruccio Mazzola, Italian footballer and manager (b. 1948)
  2013   – George Sauer, Jr., American football player (b. 1943)
2014 – Neville McNamara, Australian air marshal (b. 1923)
  2014   – Colin Pillinger, English astronomer, chemist, and academic (b. 1943)
  2014   – Dick Welteroth, American baseball player (b. 1927)
2015 – Frank DiPascali, American businessman (b. 1956)
  2015   – John Dixon, Australian-American author and illustrator (b. 1929)

Holidays and observances
Christian feast day:
Agathius of Byzantium
Agostino Roscelli
Pope Benedict II
Flavia Domitilla
Gisela of Hungary
Harriet Starr Cannon (Episcopal Church (USA))
John of Beverley
Rose Venerini
Stanislaus (Roman Martyrology)
May 7 (Eastern Orthodox liturgics)
Defender of the Fatherland Day (Kazakhstan)
Dien Bien Phu Victory Day (Vietnam)
Radio Day, commemorating the work of Alexander Popov (Russia, Bulgaria)

References

External links

 BBC: On This Day
 
 Historical Events on May 7

Days of the year
May